Self-pity is an emotion in which one feels self-centered sorrow and pity toward the self in regards to one's own internal and external experiences of suffering. Self-pity has also been defined as an emotion "directed towards others with the goal of attracting attention, empathy, or help"

Description
The feeling of self-pity typically arises when an individual attributes failures to external factors perceived as uncontrollable. Although the primary focus of self-pity is on the self and one's own emotions, it has a strong interpersonal component as well. In addition to loneliness, subjects may also feel "envy, blame, anger, and hostility directed towards others".

However, it is also very common for  people suffering from self-pity to deflect criticism of themselves; they are usually incapable of self-reflection and blame their bad situation only on external factors, such as bad luck or other people's supposed resentment.

Self-pity is different from self-compassion, which consists of extending compassion to oneself in cases of failure or general suffering.

Effects 
The research based on observation on self-pity is very slim, but the research that is available shows that self-pity can be an effect from a stressor of a dramatic event. It can also be shown that aspects of one's personality can have an effect of one's self-pity. This can also be combined with antagonistic views against others as their pity to themselves becomes jealousy to the people around. Although others initially respond to self-pity with empathic concern, the interpersonal effects of frequent expression of self-pity can be detrimental. Individuals that engage in pervasive self-pity may be more likely to be rejected by their peers and may commonly be perceived as querulous.

While looking into the science of psychology, the personalities that mostly respond to experiencing self-pity are moody and most likely experience feelings of anxiety, anger, loneliness, etc. In other words, people that are {unable to self regulate} are more likely to have self-pity for the most of their lifespan. There is also evidence that the effect of self-pity can depend on gender, with women being more vulnerable and more likely to go through with that cause.

The focus of where self-pity could rise could come from their past failings or losses and as a result could break down the mind of a person. These people in question could repeat the cycle and continue to beat themselves down to further their pain.

Treatment 
As self-pity is observed to be associated with rumination and avoidance coping strategies, it is an important emotional experience to acknowledge in therapeutic settings. When someone goes through the effects of self-pity, it has been seen that these effects can be subsided if one were to think of happy thoughts during the process, it could be beneficial to them and reduce further harm. With the research that is given, it is possible that it can be used to prescribe and tell the difference between a person with anxiety and a person with depression. With how one would deal with self-pity, one could treat their ailment by finding some sort of relief and grow away from further pain.

See also
 Moral emotions
 Pity
 Self-conscious emotions
Self-compassion
 Social emotions
 Victim playing
 Victim mentality
Pity (film) – movie about the emotion

References

Emotions